Dobrești is a commune in Dolj County, Oltenia, Romania with a population of 2,834 people. It is composed of five villages: Căciulătești, Dobrești, Georocel, Murta and Toceni.

References

Communes in Dolj County
Localities in Oltenia